is a Japanese film director. He is known for directing Zatoichi series  and the highly acclaimed Malay film Onna Gokuakuchō.

In 1950, he joined the Daiei Film and started working as an assistant director under Kenji Mizoguchi etc. In 1960, he was promoted to director and debuted with Bara Daimyo.

Selected filmography

Film 
Bara Daimyo (1960)
Zatoichi and the Chest of Gold (1964)
Zatoichi's Flashing Sword (1964)
Shinobi No Mono 5: Return of Mist Saizo (1964)
Sleepy Eyes of Death 4: Sword of Seduction (1964)
Zatoichi's Pilgrimage (1966)
Sleepy Eyes of Death 9: A Trail of Traps (1967)
Broken Swords (1969)
Sleepy Eyes of Death 12: Castle Menagerie (1969) 
Nemuri Kyōshirō manji giri (1969)
Onna Gokuakuchō (1970)
Kesho (1984)

Television 
Nemuri Kyōshirō (TV series) (1972) Episode8,11
Kogarashi Monjirō (1972) Episode5,9
Amigasa Jūbei (1974-7) Episode9,10
Monkey (TV series) (1978) Episode15,16,25,26
Shūchakueki Series (1990-2021) Episode1-37

References

External links

1929 births
Living people
People from Tokyo
Japanese film directors
Samurai film directors